Janam Janam Ka Saath is an Indian television drama series that premiered from 14 November 2022 on Dangal TV. Produced under Full House Production, it stars Gaurav S Bajaj, Nikki Sharma and Asmita Sood.

Plot 
The story revolves around the second coming of two protagonists who were separated but there love was so strong that fate has given them a second chance as Vidhi and Abeer.Now Vidhi is a poor shoemaker and Abeer is a prince of sorts.Both are arranged to be married with other people but destiny brings them together to finish the love story remained unfulfilled in their last birth.All sorts of trouble , jealousy and plotting goes on against the both of them in the serial yet sparks fly and they start falling for each other again.

Cast 
 Gaurav S Bajaj as Abhir Tomar
 Nikki Sharma as Vidhi Abir Tomar
 Asmita Sood as Trishala 
 Pankit Thakker as Vishwas (Kunwar Sa), Sunaina's second husband; Nishant's step-father
 Rakshanda Khan as Dr. Karuna Tomar
 Ginnie Virdi as Sunaina, Vishwas's wife and Nishant's mother
 Eva Grover as Trishala's mother
 Ayaz Ahmed as Nishant Tomar, Sunaina's son; Vishwas's step-son
 Miloni Kapadia as Avni Abhir Tomar
 Neeraj Malviya as Doctor
 Kaushal Kapoor

Production

Development 
The show title is based on the song from the 1969 film Tumse Achha Kaun Hai. The shooting of the series began in Jodhpur in November 2022.

The series marks comeback for Asmita Sood into fiction after COVID-19 pandemic.

Casting 
Gaurav S Bajaj was cast for the male lead. Nikki Sharma was signed as the female lead.

Asmita Sood was cast to portray the negative lead and joined by Pankit Thakker.

Release 
Janam Janam Ka Saath promos were released in November 2022. It premeried on 14 November 2022 on Dangal TV.

See also 
 List of programmes broadcast by Dangal TV

References

External links 
 Janam Janam Ka Saath on Dangal Play

Hindi-language television shows
Indian television soap operas
2022 Indian television series debuts
Dangal TV original programming